Vardine Khanzatyan (born 11 June 1989) is an Armenian professional footballer. She currently plays for Armenia women's national football team.

See also
List of Armenia women's international footballers

External links
 
Profile at UEFA.com

1989 births
Living people
Armenian women's footballers
Armenia women's international footballers
Women's association football midfielders